Monterey is a town in Putnam County, Tennessee, United States. The population was 2,850 at the 2010 census. It is part of the Cookeville, Tennessee Micropolitan Statistical Area.

History
Monterey is rooted in a settlement that developed around a landmark known as the "Standing Stone" in the late 18th and early 19th centuries.  The stone was as a guidepost for travelers along Avery's Trace, and is believed to have earlier served as a boundary marker between the territories of the Cherokee and Shawnee.  By 1805, three families had settled permanently in area, and the Standing Stone Inn was established to cater to westward-bound migrants.

In the Spring of 1864, during the Civil War, 200 Union soldiers led by Colonel William B. Stokes entered the Monterey area with orders to root out Confederate guerrilla activity. On the morning of March 12 of that year, Stokes' men entered the home of William Alexander Officer near Monterey and killed six of his guests, having accused them of being Confederate guerrillas.  A Tennessee Historical Commission marker on Commercial Avenue in Monterey remembers the event.

With the progress of rail road coming up the mountain from Cookeville, the Cumberland Mountain Coal Company, a group of 10 investors, bought property that contained coal from T.J. Whittaker. The company was interested in building a new company town to provide housing and commercial ventures for the workers. They hired Maj. Robert John Moscrip to lay out the new town. A contest was held to name it. Moscrip won. The new town was to be named “Monterey”, which meant “King of the Mountains”, and coal was king. Moscrip continued engineering the railroad tracks out the Crawford Branch into Overton County. That line opened by 1894. He was also hired to open coal lands for the Alexander Crawford family up to 1904. A female contractor was hired, which was unheard of at the time, to build a portion of that line.

On the evening of April 3, 2020, the National Weather Service issued a flash flood warning for the watershed of the Calfkiller River due to the failure of the dam confining the town's municipal lake.

Geography
Monterey is located at  (36.145291, -85.265757). The town is situated at the western edge of the Cumberland Plateau in eastern Putnam County, just north of the point where the counties of Putnam, White, and Cumberland meet, and just southwest of the point where Putnam, Overton, and Fentress meet. State Route 84 connects Monterey with Livingston to the northwest and Sparta to the southwest. State Route 62 connects Monterey with Clarkrange along U.S. Route 127 to the east, and State Route 164 connects the town with Crawford and the rural areas of the western Plateau to the north.

The sources of the Calfkiller River and the Falling Water River are both located just west of Monterey, on opposite sides of I-40.

Demographics

2020 census

As of the 2020 United States census, there were 2,746 people, 877 households, and 616 families residing in the town.

2000 census
As of the census of 2000, there were 2,717 people, 1,029 households, and 697 families residing in the town. The population density was 920.9 people per square mile (355.6/km2). There were 1,141 housing units at an average density of 386.7 per square mile (149.3/km2). The racial makeup of the town was 88.81% White, 0.92% African American, 0.04% Native American, 0.18% Asian, 9.09% from other races, and 0.96% from two or more races. Hispanic or Latino of any race were 16.34% of the population.

There were 1,029 households, out of which 31.4% had children under the age of 18 living with them, 50.0% were married couples living together, 12.9% had a female householder with no husband present, and 32.2% were non-families. 28.4% of all households were made up of individuals, and 13.9% had someone living alone who was 65 years of age or older. The average household size was 2.54 and the average family size was 3.06.

In the town, the population was spread out, with 24.7% under the age of 18, 9.7% from 18 to 24, 26.8% from 25 to 44, 21.8% from 45 to 64, and 16.9% who were 65 years of age or older. The median age was 37 years. For every 100 females, there were 95.0 males. For every 100 females age 18 and over, there were 89.1 males.

The median income for a household in the town was $23,550, and the median income for a family was $28,603. Males had a median income of $21,772 versus $18,895 for females. The per capita income for the town was $12,265. About 22.1% of families and 27.6% of the population were below the poverty line, including 38.4% of those under age 18 and 16.5% of those age 65 or over.

Notable people
Charlotte Burks, former Tennessee State Senator.
Tommy Burks, former Tennessee State Senator
Harvie June Van, country music singer

References

External links

 Official site
 Monterey High School
 Burks Elementary School
 Municipal Technical Advisory Service entry for Monterey — information on local government, elections, and link to charter

Towns in Putnam County, Tennessee
Towns in Tennessee
Cookeville, Tennessee micropolitan area